Parliamentary elections were held in Serbia on 4 March 1888. The result was a "great triumph" for the People's Radical Party, which won a large majority of seats. Of the 142 seats in Parliament, supporters of Jovan Ristić won only 13.

Background
At the start of 1888 King Milan allowed the People's Radical Party under Sava Grujić to form a government. Being in power at the time of the election allowed the party to conduct the election as it wished.

References

Serbia
1888 in Serbia
Elections in Serbia
March 1888 events